"Makin' Out" is the first single to be released from Take That band member Mark Owen's independently released third solo album, How the Mighty Fall. The single was released on 7 June 2004. The single peaked at #30 on the UK Singles Chart, and in an interview with BBC Radio 1, Owen blamed this upon poor promotion. "Makin' Out" became the most successful of Mark's independently released singles.

Track listing
 UK CD single #1
 "Makin' Out" – 3:50
 "Good For Me" – 4:11

 UK CD single #2
 "Makin' Out" – 3:50
 "Makin' Out" [Demo Version] – 3:18
 "Makin' Out" [Enhanced Video – Seven Minute Short Film Version] – 7:00

Chart performance

Covers
Pomplamoose covered this song on their album "Tribute to Famous People."

References

2004 singles
Mark Owen songs
Songs written by Mark Owen
2004 songs